Lester Spangler (January 15, 1906 – May 30, 1933) was an American racecar driver. Spangler raced with great success at Los Angeles' Legion Ascot Speedway, which led him to move up to AAA Championship racing.

Spangler and his riding mechanic Monk Jordan died while competing in the 1933 Indy 500. With Spangler on the 132nd lap, the car driven by Malcolm Fox spun coming out of turn one, and was rolling slowly towards the top the track. Spangler tried to get by on the outside, but ran out of room and plowed into Fox's car head on at over 100 miles per hour. Spangler's car rolled over while still maintaining its speed, ejecting the driver and mechanic.

The race was Spangler's second AAA Championship race start, having made his debut at the Oakland Speedway the previous year.

Indy 500 results

References

See also
List of Indianapolis fatalities

1906 births
1933 deaths
Indianapolis 500 drivers
People from Newton County, Indiana
Racing drivers from Indiana
Racing drivers who died while racing
Sports deaths in Indiana